Valtteri Järviluoma (born 29 January 1993) is a Finnish ice hockey player. He is currently playing for KJT Haukat of the 2. Divisioona, the fourth-tier league in Finland.

Jarviluoma made his SM-liiga debut playing with Ilves during the 2012–13 SM-liiga season. He went on to play nine games for Ilves before his release in 2014.

References

External links

1993 births
Living people
Finnish ice hockey forwards
Ilves players
KOOVEE players
Lempäälän Kisa players
Ice hockey people from Tampere